"Why Haven't I Heard from You" is a song written by Sandy Knox and T. W. Hale, and recorded by American country music artist Reba McEntire. It was released on March 21, 1994 as the first single from her album Read My Mind. The song reached number 5 on the Billboard Hot Country Singles & Tracks chart in July 1994.

It debuted at number 60 on the Hot Country Singles & Tracks for the week of April 9, 1994.

Music video
The music video was directed by Jon Small and premiered on CMT on March 23, 1994, as their "Hot Shot Video of the Week". It starts with Reba and her co-star boyfriend in a restaurant with a mariachi band playing in the background. The boyfriend asks her to “go away together,” and, after a ponderous think about it, she says “YES!!!” The boyfriend then says “I’ll call you at the Hollywood Parlor, at 7.” The word “7” echos as the main set is revealed (a beauty parlor) and the song begins. Reba is then shown with 4 other women trying on various disguises, getting her nails and face done, and performing. Reba waits impatiently by the parlor’s phone for her boyfriend’s call. During the final chorus, Reba and 4 women are seen in black and white outfits and top hats as they sing on a grand stage. It then goes back to the restaurant, where Reba is seen initially dozing, but after her boyfriend says her character’s name, she confronts him, saying “You didn’t even call! How dare you leave me in that beauty shop all day!” The video ends as the mariachi band finishes their performance. The video set was built in such a way that the restaurant set was actually built directly in front of the main salon set. It took 2 days to film.

Chart performance

Year-end charts

References

1994 songs
1994 singles
Reba McEntire songs
Song recordings produced by Tony Brown (record producer)
MCA Records singles